Sideridis artesta, the hairy artesta moth, is a species of cutworm or dart moth in the family Noctuidae. It is found in North America.

The MONA or Hodges number for Sideridis artesta is 10263.

References

Further reading

External links

 
 

Hadenini
Moths described in 1903